Acinos arvensis, known commonly as basil thyme and spring savory, is a species of plant of the genus Acinos.

It prefers to grow in strong sunlight. The scent is faintly reminiscent of thyme, giving it its common name.

Acinos arvensis is recorded as a food plant for the larva of the moth Coleophora tricolor.

The Plant List regards Acinos arvensis as a synonym of Clinopodium acinos.

References

Lamiaceae
Flora of Europe
Flora of temperate Asia
Taxa named by Jean-Baptiste Lamarck
Plants described in 1779